In Greek mythology, Eioneus (Ancient Greek: Ἠιονεύς) is a name attributed to the following individuals:

Eioneus, the Perrhaebian father of Dia, see Deioneus.
Eioneus, son of Magnes and Philodice and one of the suitors of Hippodamia. He, like all of the other suitors before Pelops, was killed by Oenomaus.
Eioneus, son of Proteus, father of the Phrygian king Dymas.
Eioneus, the presumed mythological eponym of the Thracian city of Eion. This character was the father of Rhesus, according to Homer. One source identifies him with Strymon, who was more commonly known as father of Rhesus.
Eioneus, a Greek warrior in the Trojan War who was killed by Hector using a sharp spear which smote his neck.
Eioneus or Eion, a Trojan warrior who was killed by Neoptolemus.

See also 
  for Jovian asteroid 15440 Eioneus

Notes

References 

 Conon, Fifty Narrations, surviving as one-paragraph summaries in the Bibliotheca (Library) of Photius, Patriarch of Constantinople translated from the Greek by Brady Kiesling. Online version at the Topos Text Project.
 Diodorus Siculus, The Library of History translated by Charles Henry Oldfather. Twelve volumes. Loeb Classical Library. Cambridge, Massachusetts: Harvard University Press; London: William Heinemann, Ltd. 1989. Vol. 3. Books 4.59–8. Online version at Bill Thayer's Web Site
 Diodorus Siculus, Bibliotheca Historica. Vol 1-2. Immanel Bekker. Ludwig Dindorf. Friedrich Vogel. in aedibus B. G. Teubneri. Leipzig. 1888-1890. Greek text available at the Perseus Digital Library.
 Homer, The Iliad with an English Translation by A.T. Murray, Ph.D. in two volumes. Cambridge, MA., Harvard University Press; London, William Heinemann, Ltd. 1924. Online version at the Perseus Digital Library.
 Homer, Homeri Opera in five volumes. Oxford, Oxford University Press. 1920. Greek text available at the Perseus Digital Library.
 Pausanias, Description of Greece with an English Translation by W.H.S. Jones, Litt.D., and H.A. Ormerod, M.A., in 4 Volumes. Cambridge, MA, Harvard University Press; London, William Heinemann Ltd. 1918. . Online version at the Perseus Digital Library
Pausanias, Graeciae Descriptio. 3 vols. Leipzig, Teubner. 1903.  Greek text available at the Perseus Digital Library.

Achaeans (Homer)
People of the Trojan War
Thessalian mythology